Hoffpauir Airport  was an airport in an unincorporated area of Harris County, Texas in the United States. It was located east of the city of Katy and west of the city of Houston. The owner was Stanley C. Hoffpauir.

A portion of the runway had an apartment complex built on it in early 2012, ending use of the airport.

External links 

Airports in Harris County, Texas
Defunct airports in Texas